The Hermann Bridge was a cantilevered truss bridge over the Missouri River at Hermann, Missouri, between Gasconade County, Missouri, and Montgomery County, Missouri. The bridge formerly carried Route 19 traffic and was closed on July 23, 2007, when the Christopher S. Bond Bridge was opened to traffic.

The bridge was built in 1930. It carried one lane of automobile traffic in each direction.

Immediately after closing of the bridge, demolition began on the portion of the southern end crossing the Union Pacific Railroad tracks to allow completion of the new Bond bridge. Demolition was completed in June 2008 with removal of the last pier.

See also
List of bridges documented by the Historic American Engineering Record in Missouri
List of crossings of the Missouri River

References

External links
Bridgehunter.com profile

Buildings and structures in Gasconade County, Missouri
Buildings and structures in Montgomery County, Missouri
Bridges completed in 1930
Historic American Engineering Record in Missouri
Road bridges in Missouri
Cantilever bridges in the United States